The New London Community School District, or New London Schools, is a rural public school district headquartered in New London, Iowa.  It is mainly in Henry County, with a smaller area in Des Moines County, and serves the city of New London and the surrounding rural areas.

Chad Wahls has served as district superintendent since 2016.

Schools
The district operates two schools, both in New London:
 Clark Elementary School
 New London Jr-Sr High School

New London High School

Athletics
The Tigers compete in the Southeast Iowa Superconference in the following sports:
Volleyball
Football
Wrestling
Basketball
Track and Field
Golf
Baseball
Softball

Students from New London can also participate in other sports through sharing agreements:
Bowling (Mount Pleasant)
Cross Country (New London-Danville)
Wrestling (New London-Winfield-Mt. Union)
Girls' Soccer (Notre Dame-Burlington)

See also
List of school districts in Iowa
List of high schools in Iowa

References

External links
 New London Community School District

School districts in Iowa
Education in Des Moines County, Iowa
Education in Henry County, Iowa